Point Lake is a lake in the Northwest Territories, Canada.

See also

List of lakes in the Northwest Territories
List of lakes of Canada

References

Lakes of the Northwest Territories